This article is about the demographic features of the population of Iceland, including population density, education level, health of the populace, economic status, religious affiliations and other aspects of the population.

As of 2022, the Icelandic population was just over 376,000. About 86,000 residents (23.7%) were of foreign background.

About 99% of the nation's inhabitants live in urban areas (localities with populations greater than 200) and 64% live in the Capital Region.

History

The population of Iceland probably wavered between about 30,000 and 80,000 for most of the time since settlement. Official statistics begin in 1703, since which the population has grown from 50,358 to 376,248 (January 2022).

Migration

Settlement 
Most Icelandic people are descendants of Norwegian settlers, and of Gaels from Ireland and Scotland who were brought over as slaves during the settlement of Iceland in the ninth century AD. Recent DNA analysis suggests that about 66 percent of the male settler-era population was of Norse ancestry and that the female population was 60 percent Celtic. Iceland remained extremely homogenous from its settlement era until the twentieth century.

Emigration 
Large numbers of Icelanders began to emigrate from Iceland in the 1850s. It has been estimated that 17,000 Icelanders immigrated to North America in the period 1870–1914, and that 2,000 of them moved back to Iceland; this net loss, 15,000, was about 20% of the Icelandic population in 1887. According to historian Gunnar Karlsson, "migration from Iceland is unique in that most went to Canada, whereas from most or all other European countries the majority went to the United States. This was partly due to the late beginning of emigration from Iceland after the Canadian authorities had begun to promote emigration in cooperation with the Allan Line, which already had an agent in Iceland in 1873. Contrary to most European countries, this promotion campaign was successful in Iceland, because emigration was only just about to start from there and Icelandic emigrants had no relatives in the United States to help them take the first steps".

In the wake of the 2008 Icelandic financial crisis, many Icelanders went to work abroad.

Immigration
Before the 1990s, there was little immigration to Iceland, and most of it was from other Scandinavian countries: about 1% of Icelanders in 1900 were of Danish heritage (born either in Denmark or to Danish parents). In the mid-1990s, 95% of Icelanders had parents of Icelandic origin, and 2% of Icelanders were first-generation immigrants (born abroad with both parents and all grandparents foreign-born).

Immigration to Iceland rose rapidly in the late twentieth century, encouraged by Iceland's accession to the European Economic Area in 1994, its entry into the Schengen Agreement in 2001, and the country's economic boom in the early twenty-first century. The largest ethnic minority is Poles, who are about a third of the immigrant population. In 2017, 10.6% of the people were first-generation immigrants.

Iceland is also developing relatively small populations of religious minorities, including Catholics (about 15,000 in 2020, 4.02% of Icelanders), Baháʼís (about 400 in 2010), Jews (about 250 in 2018), Buddhists (about 1,500 in 2021), and Muslims (about 1,300 in 2015).

Research on the experience of immigrants to Iceland is in its early days. There is some evidence that racism is not as acute in Iceland as in neighbouring countries [Which countries are neighbors to Iceland?]. But, while it is popularly believed in Iceland that racism does not exist there, there is evidence that in some respects immigrant populations experience prejudice and inequalities. For example, Iceland has a higher dropout rate from upper secondary school among young immigrants than the EEA average.

Iceland does not formally collect data on the ethnicity or racial identification of its citizens, but does collect data of the origin and background group by birth.

Due to a shortage of labor, immigration to Iceland will most likely increase in the future. Estimates show that the number of immigrants could be as high as 15% of the total population by 2030.

Patronymy 

Most Icelandic surnames are based on patronymy, or the adoption of the father's first given name, followed by "son" or "daughter". For example, Magnús and Anna, children of a man named Pétur Jónsson, would have the full name Magnús Pétursson and Anna Pétursdóttir, respectively. Magnús's daughter Sigríður Ásta would be Sigríður Ásta Magnúsdóttir, and would remain so for the rest of her life regardless of marriage. An Icelandic patronymic is essentially only a designation of fatherhood, and is therefore redundant in Icelandic social life except to differentiate people of the same first name the phone directory, for example, lists people by their given name first, patronymic second. Thus it has little in common with traditional surnames except for its position after the given name. It is legally possible in Iceland to rework the patronymic into a matronymic, replacing the father's name with the mother's. Use of the patronymic system is required by law, except for the descendants of those who had acquired family names before 1913 (about 10% of the population). One notable Icelander who has an inherited family name is football star Eiður Smári Guðjohnsen.

Urbanisation 

According to University of Iceland economists Davíd F. Björnsson and Gylfi Zoega, "The policies of the colonial masters in Copenhagen delayed urbanisation. The Danish king maintained a monopoly in trade with Iceland from 1602 until 1855, which made the price of fish artificially low – the price of fish was higher in Britain – and artificially raised the price of agricultural products. Instead, Denmark bought the fish caught from Iceland at below world market prices. Although the trade monopoly ended in 1787, Icelanders could not trade freely with other countries until 1855. Following trade liberalisation, there was a substantial increase in fish exports to Britain, which led to an increase in the number of sailing ships used in fishing, introduced for the first time in 1780. The growth of the fishing industry then created demand for capital, and in 1885 Parliament created the first state bank (Landsbanki). In 1905 came the first motorised fishing vessel, which marked an important step in the development of a specialised fishing industry in Iceland. Iceland exported fresh fish to Britain and salted cod to southern Europe, with Portugal an important export market. Fishing replaced agriculture as the country’s main industry. These developments set the stage for the urbanisation that was to follow in the twentieth century."

A 2017 study looking at individuals going to the capital area for higher education found that "Only about one in three [University of Iceland] students from regions beyond commuting distance return after graduation, while about half remain in the capital area and others mostly emigrate."

Religion 
In 2016, 71.6% of the population belonged to the state church (the Evangelical Lutheran Church of Iceland), approximately 5% in free churches, 3.7% to the Roman Catholic Church, approximately 1% to the Ásatrúarfélagið (a legally recognized revival of the pre-Christian religion of Iceland), approximately 1% to Zuism, 8% in unrecognized or unspecified religious groups, and 9% do not belong to any religious group.

Icelandic National Registry 

All living Icelanders, as well as all foreign citizens with permanent residence in Iceland, have a personal identification number (kennitala) identifying them in the National Registry. This number is composed of 10 digits, whereof the first six are made up of the individual's birth date in the format DDMMYY. The next two digits are chosen at random when the kennitala is allocated, the 9th digit is a check digit, and the last digit indicates the period of one hundred years in which the individual was born (for instance, '9' for the period 1900–1999). An example would be 120192-3389. While similar, all-inclusive personal registries exist in other countries, the use of the national registry is unusually extensive in Iceland. It is worth noting that the completeness of the National Registry eliminates any need for census to be performed.

Summary of vital statistics since 1900 
Data according to Statistics Iceland, which collects the official statistics for Iceland.

Current vital statistics

Population projection

Life expectancy 

Source: UN World Population Prospects

CIA World Factbook demographic statistics 
The following demographic statistics are from the CIA World Factbook, unless otherwise indicated.

Age structure
0–14 years:
20.4% (male 35,418/female 33,887)
15–24 years:
13.5% (male 23,190/female 22,659)
25–54 years:
39.88% (male 68,579/female 66,899)
55–64:
11.81% (male 20,119/female 20,007)
65 years and over:
14.42% (male 22,963/female 26,053) (2017 est.)

Sex ratio
at birth:
1.05 males: 1 female
under 15 years:
1.05 males: 1 female

15–24 years:
1.03 males: 1 female

25–54 years:
1.02 males: 1 female
55–64 years:
1.01 males: 1 female
65 years and over:
0.88 males: 1 female
total population:
1.01 male: 1 female
(2016 est.)

Maternal mortality rate
3 deaths/100,000 live births (2015 est.)

Infant mortality rate
2.1 deaths/1,000 live births
(2016 est.)

Life expectancy at birth
total population:
83.0 years
male:
80.9 years
female:
85.3 years
(2016 est.)

Health expenditures
8.9% of GDP (2014)

Physicians density
3.79 physicians/1,000 population (2015)

Obesity adult prevalence rate
23.9% (2014)

Education expenditures
7.8% of GDP (2013)

Mother's mean age at first birth
27.4 (2015 est.)

Nationality
noun:
Icelander(s)
adjective:
Icelandic

Ethnic groups
94% Icelandic,
6% other

Religions
Evangelical Lutheran Church of Iceland (official) 69.9%, Roman Catholic 3.8%, Reykjavik Free Church 2.9%, Hafnarfjörður Free Church 2%, Ásatrú Association 1.1%, The Independent Congregation 1%, other religions 4% (includes Zuist and Pentecostal), none 6.1%, other or unspecified 9.2% (2017 est.)

Languages
Icelandic (English and a second Nordic language, Danish by default, are also a part of the Icelandic compulsory education)

References

External links
  the national statistical institute of Iceland
 
 A 2012 report by the Ministry of Welfare on migration to and from Iceland 1961–2011.